Juan José Morales (born May 13, 1982 in Bella Vista, Tucumán, Argentina) is an Argentine football forward.

Career
A native of Tucumán province, Morales (also known as Jota Jota) began his football career with local side San Martín de Tucumán. He went on loan to Central Norte and Atlético Concepción, and helped San Martín win promotion from the Torneo Argentino C and Primera B Nacional.

Morales left San Martín in 2007, but did not settle in the Argentine Primera División with Club Atlético Colón. Although Morales struggled at Colón, he would later enjoy success against the club, first with Universidad Católica (Copa Libertadores) and then with Quilmes (Primera División). The next season he joined Quilmes Atlético Club, where he would lead the club with 16 goals in the 2008–09 Primera B Nacional. Spells with Club Deportivo Universidad Católica and Argentinos Juniors followed. Morales would spend the rest of his career as a journeyman, with spells abroad in Venezuela, Brazil, Chile and Malaysia. Throughout his career, Morales scored 68 league goals in Argentina's top four divisions.

In late 2014, Morales made the decision to cancel his contract with Venezuelan side A.C.C.D. Mineros de Guayana and join his partner, Flaviana Seeling (a member of the Brazilian music group Axé Bahia) on the Chilean reality television competition Amor a prueba.

References

External links
 
 
 

1982 births
Living people
Sportspeople from Tucumán Province
Argentine footballers
Association football forwards
San Martín de Tucumán footballers
Club Atlético Colón footballers
Quilmes Atlético Club footballers
Argentinos Juniors footballers
Club Deportivo Universidad Católica footballers
Paraná Clube players
C.D. Huachipato footballers
All Boys footballers
Argentine Primera División players
Primera Nacional players
Chilean Primera División players
Argentine expatriate footballers
Expatriate footballers in Chile
Expatriate footballers in Brazil